Switzerland competed at the FIS Alpine World Ski Championships 2021 in Cortina d'Ampezzo, Switzerland, from 8 to 21 February 2021.

Medalists

Results

Men

Women

References

External links
 Swiss Ski 
 Cortina 2021 official site

Nations at the FIS Alpine World Ski Championships 2021
Alpine World Ski Championships
Switzerland at the FIS Alpine World Ski Championships